The 2022 Women's World Team Squash Championships was the women's edition of the 2022 World Team Squash Championships, which serves as the world team championship for squash players. The event, held at the Madinaty Sports Club in Cairo, took place from 10 to 16 December 2022. The tournament was organised by the World Squash Federation. The Egypt team won its fifth World Team Championships, beating the United States team in the final.

Two teams made debuts at the championship, with Chinese Taipei and Ukraine appearing for the first time.

After the tournament, Japan's Satomi Watanabe was named Tournament MVP after winning all of her matches, while South Africa were named Team of the Tournament.

Participating teams
17 teams competed in these world championships from all of the five confederations: Africa, America, Asia, Europe and Oceania.

Squads

  Australia
 Alex Haydon
 Jessica Turnbull
 Donna Lobban
 Sarah Cardwell

  Canada
 Nicole Bunyan
 Hollie Naughton
 Nikki Todd
 Samantha Cornett

  Chinese Taipei
 Yi-Hsuan Lee
 Yuan Wang
 Wei-Ting Huang
 Yi-Chun Wu

  Egypt
 Nour El Sherbini
 Nour El Tayeb
 Nouran Gohar
 Hania El Hammamy

  England
 Jasmine Hutton
 Lucy Turmel
 Sarah-Jane Perry
 Julianne Courtice

  Finland
 Emilia Korhonen
 Emilia Soini
 Riina Koskinen
 Maarit Ekholm-Mangaonkar

  France
 Camille Serme
 Coline Aumard
 Énora Villard
 Mélissa Alves

  Germany
 Maya Weishar
 Sharon Sinclair
 Katerina Tycova
 Saskia Beinhard

  Hong Kong
 Tomato Ho
 Chan Sin Yuk
 Lee Ka Yi
 Tong Tsz Wing

  Japan
 Akari Midorikawa
 Erisa Sano Herring
 Risa Sugimoto
 Satomi Watanabe

  Malaysia
 Aifa Azman
 Rachel Arnold
 Chan Yiwen
 Yee Xin Ying

  Scotland
 Lisa Aitken
 Georgia Adderley
 Alison Thomson
 Katriona Allen

  South Africa
 Alexandra Fuller
 Hayley Ward
 Lizelle Muller
 Cheyna Wood

  Switzerland
 Céline Walser
 Cindy Merlo
 Ambre Allinckx
 Nadia Pfister

  Ukraine
 Anastasiia Kostiukovay
 Milena Velychko
 Anastasiia Krykun
 Daria Vlasenko

  United States
 Amanda Sobhy
 Olivia Fiechter
 Olivia Clyne
 Sabrina Sobhy

  Wales
 Emily Whitlock
 Lowri Roberts
 Stacey Gooding
 Elin Harlow

Results

Group stage

Pool A
10 December

11 December

12 December

13 December

Pool B
10 December

11 December

12 December

13 December

Pool C
10 December

11 December

12 December

13 December

Pool D
10 December

11 December

12 December

13 December

Quarter-finals

Semi finals

Final

Final standings

See also 
 World Team Squash Championships

References

Squash tournaments in Egypt
World Squash Championships
Womens World Squash Championships
W
International sports competitions hosted by Egypt
World Team Squash Championships